Julie MacDonald may refer to:

Julie A. MacDonald (born 1955), former U.S. Department of the Interior official
Julie MacDonald (journalist), Scottish journalist and presenter, currently working for Al Jazeera English
Julie Fader, also credited as Julie MacDonald, Canadian musician, songwriter and visual artist

See also
Julie McDonald (disambiguation)